Puckerman may refer to:

Jake Puckerman, fictional character
Noah Puckerman, fictional character